Matou a Família e Foi ao Cinema (Killed the Family and Went to the Movies) is a Brazilian film directed by Neville de Almeida and released in 1991. It is a remake of the original 1969 film directed by Júlio Bressane.

Production
Actress Cláudia Raia talked about her difficulties in filming a nude scene with a horse for this movie. Raia said that for this scene, filmed on a cold dawn, she wore only a bodice and that the horse needed to be calmed down in a moment. "There was a scene of mine naked, only with a bodice, which we shot on a cold morning in Teresópolis. My character almost had sex with the horse, which was actually her dream. At a certain point, the horse went crazy and needed to be removed from the scene in order to get a little out of it ", she said.

References

External links 
 

1991 drama films
Brazilian drama films
1990s Portuguese-language films
1991 films